Chaitra H. G. (born 18 June 1984) is an Indian playback singer who sings predominantly in Kannada films. She has also recorded songs in Telugu, Tamil and Malayalam films, with the number totalling to over 600.

Kannada film songs

1994

2003

2004

2005

2006

2007

2008

2009

2010

2011

2012

2013

2014

2015

2017

Tamil songs

References

External links 
 Chaitra H. G. discography at Music India Online

H. G., Chaitra
Kannada film songs